Boise City Airport  is in Cimarron County, Oklahoma, four miles north of the City of Boise City, which owns it.

History
The airport was activated in August of 1946.  The 1927 trans-Atlantic flight of Charles Lindbergh led to development of municipal airports generally in Oklahoma.

Facilities

The airport averaged 67 aircraft operations per week for the 12-month period ending 26 November 2019.  Twelve aircraft were then based at the airport: 10 single-engine and 2 multi-engine.

References

External links 
 

Airports in Oklahoma